Siin me oleme! (Estonian) is a 1979 Estonian movie written and directed by Sulev Nõmmik.  The script was compiled on Juhan Smuul's motifs from Suvitajad (Estonian for Summer tourists).

Influence
Together with Viimne reliikvia, Noor pensionär and Mehed ei nuta, Siin me oleme! is one of the most memorable Estonian movies from the Soviet era.  Even decades later, Smuul's catchphrases popularised by the movie, such as 'We're from Tallinn, we'll pay!' are widely recognised and recycled by Estonian people.

Cast
Lia Laats as Kohviveski
Ervin Abel as John
Renate Karter as Lõke
Karl Kalkun as Ärni
Eva Meil as Ärni's wife
Kadri Jäätma as Liina
Sulev Nõmmik as Aadu
Väino Puura as Mart
Lauri Nebel as Timmu

External links
Siin me oleme! at the Estonian Public Broadcasting Archives 

Soviet-era Estonian films
1979 comedy films
1979 films
Soviet comedy films
Estonian comedy films